Risk is a turn-based strategy video game based on the board game of the same name, released in 1996.

History
In 1996, Hasbro Interactive released a PC version of Risk that included a new variation on the game called Ultimate Risk, which did not use dice but rather implemented the use of forts, generals, and complex battle strategies.

Reception

Next Generation reported that Risk sold "exceptionally well" during 1997.

In Computer Gaming World, Terry Coleman called Risk an improvement over previous computer adaptations of the board game, and wrote that "in some ways, Risk even outshines Monopoly CD-ROM on the computer." He praised its Classic Risk mode, and hailed Ultimate Risk as "a superb enhancement to a classic game." Reviewing the game for PC Zone, Chris Anderson wrote, "Hasbro have taken a classic board-game, put it on pc, and brought lots of new features to it, and I for one enjoyed it. It's addictive, highly replayable, and it looks quite smart too. If it had real-time combat we would have been talking a 90+ score".

PC Gamer UKs Mark Donald criticized Risks artificial intelligence for failing to recreate the experience of board game play, but called it "a moderately enjoyable game" overall.

Next Generation reviewed the PlayStation version of the game, rating it two stars out of five, and stated that "For Risk fanatics who sometimes have trouble convening games with human opponents, this is a decently satisfying quick fix, as you can play against several computer players. But for anyone else, it's an unexciting, uninspiring, unimpressive interpretation of a classic game."

The game was a finalist for Computer Gaming Worlds 1996 "Classic/Puzzle Game of the Year" award, which ultimately went to Baku Baku Animal.

References

1996 video games
NMS Software games
Risk (game)
Video games based on board games
Video games developed in the United States
Windows games